Vijai Sardesai (born 14 June 1970) is an Indian politician who is currently a member of the Goa Legislative Assembly representing the Fatorda constituency and belongs to the Goa Forward Party. He also served as Deputy Chief Minister of Goa in the Government of Goa, until his withdrawal from the cabinet of ministers on 13 July 2019.

Early life and personal background
Vijai Sardesai was born on 14 June 1970 in Buenos Aires, Argentina to Jaivant and Laxmibai (née Mogabai) Sardesai. His father Jaivant was a  scientist/entomologist who served with the United Nations. His siblings are Savita Kerkar and (Late) Madhavi Sardesai. Sardesai earned a Bachelor of Science degree in agriculture from the Dr. Balasaheb Sawant Konkan Krishi Vidyapeeth in 1992 and is a real estate dealer by profession.

Vijai married Usha Sardesai and they have a daughter named Urvi.

Sardesai is the President of the Progressive Goa Wrestling Association and also of the Goa Dodgeball Association. Sardesai has pledged to donate his eyes post his death.

Political career 
Vijai started his political career in the student politics of Goa. He was the Chairman of the Goa University Students Council. Sardesai started his political career in the Indian National Congress and he was the President of Goa Pradesh Youth Congress. Sardesai was co-opted as a councillor of the Margao Municipal Council.

Independent MLA
Vijai Sardesai was denied the Indian National Congress candidature from the Fatorda constituency during the 2012 Goa Legislative Assembly election. Sardesai quit the Indian National Congress as an independent candidate and emerged victorious.

During his debut as an independent MLA, Sardesai emerged as a fierce opposition figure. His performance on the floor of the Goa Legislative Assembly and outside the Assembly too made Sardesai popular. Vijai Sardesai ensured the victory of his panel in the Margao Municipal Council elections in 2015. Sardesai was accused by his opponents of being involved in the Louis Berger bribery scam but the allegations remain unproven.

Goa Forward Party
On 25 January 2016, the Goa Forward Party was launched. Although Sardesai was a mentor of the party, he did not officially join it because of the Anti-Defection Law. Sardesai joined the party on 16 January 2017 and contested the 2017 Goa Legislative Assembly election as a candidate of the Goa Forward Party. The party contested in only four constituencies in the 2017 Assembly elections and emerged victorious in three.

Minister in the Manohar Parrikar-led government
No single party obtained the requisite majority of 21 seats in the 2017 elections but the Indian National Congress emerged as the largest party with 17 seats. Sardesai and the two other Goa Forward Party legislators supported the Bharatiya Janata Party (BJP) which secured 13 seats, on the condition that Manohar Parrikar would be appointed the Chief Minister of Goa. Sardesai, whose whole campaign was based on the anti-BJP premise, was criticised by many including his supporters for this act. The Goa Forward Party President Prabhakar Timble resigned after Sardesai and the other two party MLAs accorded their support towards formation of the BJP-led government in Goa.

Sardesai justified his decision by stating that the Indian National Congress party as well as the Goa Pradesh Congress Committee President Luizinho Faleiro had ditched him before. He stated that the BJP in Goa was different from that of the national BJP and that the government would work according to a common minimum programme. Sardesai claimed that he would act as a watchdog of Geomkarponn (Goanness) in the government and that he had supported the BJP-led government for stability and development.

Vijai Sardesai was sworn in as a cabinet Minister in the Government of Goa headed by Manohar Parrikar on 14 March 2017. The other two Goa Forward Party legislators, Vinoda Paliencar and Jayesh Salgaonkar were also sworn in as cabinet Ministers.

At a largely attended protest meet on 18 March 2017 at Margao's Lohia Maidan, Sardesai was condemned by many for supporting the Bharatiya Janata Party government led by Manohar Parrikar.

References 

Goa MLAs 2022–2027
Living people
1970 births
People from Buenos Aires
People from South Goa district
Indian National Congress politicians from Goa
Goa MLAs 2017–2022
Goa Forward Party politicians
Goa Rajiv Congress Party politicians